Oriana or Oriane is a female name.

It may also refer to:

 , a tug sunk in 1948
 SS Oriana (1959), a 1959-built ocean liner
 MV Oriana (1994), a 1995-built cruise ship
 Orania, Northern Cape, an Afrikaner community in South Africa.
 Oreana, Illinois, a village in the United States
 Oriana Cinema, an art-deco building in Fremantle, Western Australia, demolished in 1972
 Oriana (film), a 1985 film by Fina Torres
 Oriana (grape), another name for the Italian wine grape Uva Rara
 Oriana (horse), a British Thoroughbred racehorse, foaled 1807
 "Oriana (September 24, 1988)", a song by Al Di Meola from Kiss My Axe
 Oriana, a 19th-century play by James Albery
 Oriana, Windows software for circular statistics/orientation analysis
 Oriane Ou la Cinquième Couleur, a 2002 novel by Paul-Loup Sulitzer
 Oriane, a fictional character in the novel Labyrinth by Kate Mosse.
 Orianna, the Lady of Clockwork, a playable champion character in the multiplayer online battle arena video game League of Legends
 The Triumphs of Oriana, a 1601 book of madrigals by Thomas Morley

People
Orianna Andrews, American medical doctor